Jesper Appel (born January 23, 1993) is a Swedish professional ice hockey defenceman who currently plays for Färjestads BK in the Swedish Elitserien.

References

External links

1993 births
Färjestad BK players
Living people
Swedish ice hockey defencemen
Sportspeople from Karlstad